Batavia High School, or BHS, is a public four-year high school located in Batavia, Illinois. 
It was created by the merger of West Batavia High School and East Batavia High School (and their separate school districts) in 1911 and is part of Batavia Unified School District 101; the East Batavia and West Batavia athletic programs merged in 1909. Since 2009, the school has added a new "D Wing" of classrooms, "E Wing" of music rooms, a fieldhouse, new athletic facilities, and an auditorium ("F Wing"), which was completed in 2011.

Academics
Batavia High School has an average class size of 25 and a graduation rate of 94%.

16 Advanced Placement (AP) courses are offered at BHS.

In 2022, BHS graduated 538 students. 61% of these graduates enrolled in a four-year college, 14% enrolled in a two-year college, 1% went directly to employment, 1% went into the military, and 25% had plans elsewhere.

80% of the class of 2022 had post-secondary experiences while still in high school through BHS, including AP and dual-credit classes, courses through Fox Valley Career Center, and a Waubonsee Community College manufacturing program.

Athletics

Batavia was a founding member of the Western Sun Conference (WSC), but joined the Upstate Eight Conference the following dissolution of the WSC in June 2010. In 2018–19, Batavia left the Upstate Eight to join the DuKane Conference. BHS is a full member of the Illinois High School Association. The school's mascot is a Bulldog and the team is often referred to as the "Battlin' Bulldogs." The school's biggest rival is Geneva High School, which is located in Geneva, a town directly to the north of Batavia. From 1913 through 2014, the Geneva Vikings and the Batavia Bulldogs have faced off on the football field 97 times. The current record is 51–41–5, favoring Geneva. The Batavia–Geneva game is among the twenty-oldest football rivalries in the state of Illinois.

Basketball
Batavia's first team dates to 1905–06. Batavia won its only state championship in 1912. Former Bulldogs hoopsters include Ken Anderson, Dan Issel, Dean Anderson, and the late TNT sideline announcer, Craig Sager.

Soccer
Batavia competes in IHSA competition in both boys and girls soccer. Batavia soccer alumni include 1989 Collegiate Champion Mike Fisher.

Football
The 2011 season, the Bulldogs went 9–0 (first in school history). In 2006, the Batavia Varsity Football Team played in the Class 6A State Championship game at the University of Illinois' Memorial Stadium against Normal Community High School. They took second place.  In 2013, the Bulldogs won the Class 6A State Championship game 34–14  over Richards High School of Oak Lawn. In 2017, the Bulldogs won the Class 7A State Championship game in Northern Illinois University' Huskie Stadium, beting Lake Zurich High School 20–14 in overtime.

Marching Band
In 2009, The Marching Bulldogs began competing in various competitions around the state. In 2011, the Marching Bulldogs received new uniforms, switching from their traditional white pants and red jacket to an all black uniform featuring a single red "B". 2015 was the band's most successful year with their show "Square the Circle" with music by jazz guitarist Pat Metheny. They placed in every competition including 3rd in class at the ISU competition and 7th overall in preliminaries, and won multiple awards for best color guard, visuals, and percussion.

Competitive Cheer Team
The Batavia Cheer Team has competed in ICCA and IHSA competitions since their inception in the early 2000s. They qualified for the 2012 State Championship in Bloomington, Il. The team has fluctuated between the Large All Girl and Coed divisions.

Dance Team
In 2013, both the JV and Varsity teams competed in the TDI Grand Championship competition. Varsity placed 1st in Pom, 2nd in lyrical and 3rd in the hip-hop category. JV placed first in both the Pom and Jazz categories and were the overall grand championship for all JV teams. In 2015 the team competed in the UDA national championship in Orlando.

Notable events

Bomb plot 
On November 26, 2019, a BHS student was arrested and charged with 14 crimes, including attempted first-degree murder and terrorism, for allegedly plotting to bomb the school.

The FBI was tipped off on the case by a science supplies store on "suspicious purchases." With local authorities, they conducted a search of the student's home and discovered numerous chemicals, compounds, and laboratory equipment to make bombs. In his notebook, he allegedly planned a "Dies irae," latin for "Day of Wrath," at BHS in which he would "detonate bombs in the high school’s restrooms, throw molotov cocktails and a hand grenade down hallways and die in a suicide," according to prosecutors.

The student was later diagnosed with schizophrenia. An FBI social media check on him found "suspicious accounts that were suspected to be related to anti-Semitism/Nazi/Hitler."

The student's case was transferred to adult court and he was detained for months before pleading guilty. As part of the plea deal, he avoided potentially decades in prison but agreed to serve four years of probation and mental health treatment in a residency program.

Music
There are approximately 500 students in the school involved in music, with 13 curricular ensembles and 8 extracurricular ensembles. This includes four concert bands, four concert orchestras, and five choral ensembles. Extracurricular groups include the two show choir groups Swingsingers (Coed) and Legacy (female only), the A cappella group Chromatics, a marching band, Troubadours, Madrigals, two big band ensembles, Chamber Orchestra, Pep band, and more. Each spring, the school puts on a musical with a full pit orchestra. Some include 2011's "Beauty and the Beast", 2012's "9 to 5", 2017's "Rent", and most recently "The SpongeBob Musical" in 2022. Each year distinguished students of the music department participate in the Illinois Music Educators Association district IX and state honor music groups. In 2017 the highest level band, Wind Symphony, was accepted to perform at the University of Illinois Superstate concert band festival and also at the 2018 Illinois Music Education Conference (IMEC). As of 2022 the band has performed at the Superstate festival every year since, excluding 2020 due to its cancellation because of the COVID-19 pandemic; they have also been invited to perform at IMEC again in January 2023. Batavia High School was recognized as a Grammy Signature School Semifinalist in 2014, 2015, and 2016.

School layout
The school is divided into six wings, labeled A through F.
A Wing: Contains mostly specialty classrooms, such as culinary arts, video production, and graphics arts classrooms; location of the gym and cafeteria.
B Wing: Contains the library and administration offices.
C Wing: Located on the east end of the building; covers two floors; contains most core classrooms, such as social studies, math, and world language classrooms, with some science and english classrooms.
D Wing: Located on the north end of the building; covers two floors; and contains science, english, and art classrooms.
E Wing: Located on the northwest part of the building; contains the chorus, orchestra, and band rooms, music offices, music storage rooms, and music practice rooms.
F Wing: Located on the west end of the building, contains the Batavia Fine Arts Centre, field house, and gym storage rooms.

Notable alumni

 Ken Anderson (born 1949) quarterback for the Cincinnati Bengals and 1981 NFL Most Valuable Player.
 William B. Downs (1899-1966), orthodontist who created first Cephalometric Analysis in the field of Orthodontics.
 Dan Issel (born 1948), professional basketball player, playing in the ABA (1970–76) and NBA (1976–85).  He was elected to the Basketball Hall of Fame in 1993.
 John Mauer (1901-1978), college basketball head coach for University of Kentucky, Tennessee, Florida and Army.
 Craig Sager (1951-2016), sportscaster for TNT and TBS; born in Batavia and attended BHS.

References

External links
 Official Website

Public high schools in Illinois
Buildings and structures in Batavia, Illinois
Schools in Kane County, Illinois
Educational institutions established in 1911
1911 establishments in Illinois